Shooting competitions at the 2014 Commonwealth Games in Glasgow, Scotland were held from 25 to 29 July at the Barry Buddon Shooting Centre.

Medal table

Medalists

Men's events

Women's events

Queen's Prize (open to men & women)

Participating nations

References

External links
Official results book – Shooting

 
2014 Commonwealth Games events
2014
Commonwealth Games
Shooting competitions in the United Kingdom